Wallingford Rural District, an administrative area in what was then Berkshire, now Oxfordshire area, in southern England was established in 1894, from the then Berkshire area within Wallingford Rural Sanitary Authority (the Oxfordshire area becoming Crowmarsh Rural District). Wallingford Rural District Council provided many local government functions for the area around the town of Wallingford including Didcot, but not for the borough of Wallingford, which was covered by Wallingford Borough Council. These functions included dealing with contagious diseases, and wartime evacuations and air raid precautions. It also covered housing, water supply and sewage, and fire brigades. 

In 1974 Wallingford RD became part of the district of South Oxfordshire, administered by South Oxfordshire District Council.

Civil parishes
The district contained the following civil parishes during its existence:

References

Districts of England abolished by the Local Government Act 1972
Districts of England created by the Local Government Act 1894
Rural districts of England
Former districts of Berkshire